Reference Re Securities Act is a landmark opinion of the Supreme Court of Canada to a reference question posed on the extent of the ability of the Parliament of Canada to use its trade and commerce power.

Background

Canadian securities regulation is unique in that the field is solely regulated by provincial and territorial governments. While those governments have worked to harmonize many of their policies, there is still enough variation that securities issuers must reconcile in order to have their securities trade among residents in each of the jurisdictions involved.

Since the 1930s, there has been debate about the desirability of establishing a single national securities regulator. In 2010, a draft Canadian Securities Act was published, and a reference question was posed to the Supreme Court of Canada on its constitutionality.

Provincial references

The provincial governments of Alberta and Quebec had previously posed reference questions to their respective Courts of Appeal on the subject. In March 2011, the Alberta Court of Appeal ruled unanimously that the federal proposal in its entirety was an unconstitutional intrusion into provincial jurisdiction.

In the same month, the Quebec Court of Appeal made a similar ruling in a 4-1 split decision, but stated that sections 148-152 and 158-168 of the proposed Act (dealing with orders for the production of information, criminal offences, prohibition orders and restitution orders) were valid under the criminal law power, and that there was no question that the Act would be constitutional if it focused solely on international and interprovincial regulation of securities transactions. The Alberta Court had considered the criminal law provisions to be so incidental to the purpose of the Act that they could not stand on their own, and it did not discuss in detail the international and interprovincial questions.

Question posed

Arguments offered at the hearing
At issue was the question of whether the regulation of the securities industry is a valid exercise of the federal trade and commerce power. In that regard, arguments focused on the applicability of the five criteria for such an analysis that were previously identified in General Motors of Canada Ltd. v. City National Leasing:

 the impugned legislation must be part of a regulatory scheme;
 the scheme must be monitored by the continuing oversight of a regulatory agency;
 the legislation must be concerned with trade as a whole rather than with a particular industry;
 the legislation should be of a nature that provinces jointly or severally would be constitutionally incapable of enacting; and
 the failure to include one or more provinces or localities in a legislative scheme would jeopardize the successful operation of the scheme in other parts of the country.

If the trade and commerce power does not apply, then securities regulation, being in pith and substance under the property and civil rights power, falls exclusively within provincial jurisdiction, as the double aspect and paramountcy doctrines would not come into play.

Both sides agreed that the first two General Motors criteria were met, and subsequent arguments revolved around the other three. Numerous submissions were presented to the Court on this question.

There was general agreement among observers that the resulting decision will affect Canadian federalism beyond the immediate question of securities regulation.

Trade as a whole
Canada argued that securities law transcends all industries, and thus should be a valid exercise of the trade and commerce power, in the same way as for competition law. On the other side, it was argued that the securities industry should be viewed in the same manner as the insurance industry, which since Citizen's Insurance Co. v. Parsons has been held to fall under provincial jurisdiction.

Ability of the provinces to regulate jointly or severally
Canada noted that, while the provincial securities regulators efforts to operate a passport system have met with some success, there are still some significant constitutional limitations on their ability to regulate the securities industry in the modern age:

 the provinces cannot apply their regulations extra-provincially;
 the securities industry has become primarily international in scope;
 provinces cannot regulate federally incorporated companies; and
 provinces lack the ability to include criminal sanctions with their regulations

Alberta, among others, argued that there were no flaws in the present passport system that could not be fixed, and that the proposed Act contained nothing that could not be found in current provincial legislation.

Jeopardizing the successful operation of the scheme
As the proposed Act contains an opt-in clause (providing that it would only apply in provinces that choose to participate), it was argued that this shows that unanimous provincial involvement is not necessary and that therefore this should be considered an area that the provinces are more than capable of regulating without the involvement of the Federal Government. Canada responded that this represented an example of the current model of cooperative federalism that had already been employed in agricultural products marketing, and which was approved by the Court in Reference re Agricultural Products Marketing Act.

Opinion of the Supreme Court of Canada
The Court held that, as presently drafted, the proposed Act is not valid under the general branch of the federal power to regulate trade and commerce. It is mainly focused on the day‑to‑day regulation of all aspects of contracts for securities within the provinces, including all aspects of public protection and professional competences.  These matters remain essentially provincial concerns falling within property and civil rights in the provinces and are not related to trade as a whole.

Specific aspects of the Act aimed at addressing matters of genuine national importance and scope going to trade as a whole in a way that is distinct from provincial concerns, including management of systemic risk and national data collection, appear to be related to the general trade and commerce power.  With respect to these aspects of the Act, the provinces, acting alone or in concert, lack the constitutional capacity to sustain a viable national scheme.

In sum, the proposed Act overreaches genuine national concerns.  While the economic importance and pervasive character of the securities market may, in principle, support federal intervention that is qualitatively different from what the provinces can do, they do not justify a wholesale takeover of the regulation of the securities industry which is the ultimate consequence of the proposed federal legislation.  A cooperative approach that permits a scheme recognizing the essentially provincial nature of securities regulation while allowing Parliament to deal with genuinely national concerns remains available and is supported by Canadian constitutional principles and by the practice adopted by the federal and provincial governments in other fields of activities.

Addressing the nature of this question within the context of Canadian federalism, the Court noted:

Significance
The immediate effect of the decision:

 The real question at hand was about the nature of Canadian federalism in dealing with a matter that does not fall squarely within either federal or provincial jurisdiction.
 The trade and commerce power, as originally conceived in Parsons and clarified in General Motors, is still good constitutional law that does not need to be revisited.
 The property and civil rights power is adequate for dealing with the day-to-day aspects of securities regulation, as they do not possess a national dimension.
 Certain aspects of the proposed Act would be valid, but only those with a national dimension, international and interprovincial elements, or that are related to the criminal law power.

The Federal Government has confirmed that it will not proceed with the proposed Act. There is currently extensive discussion as to the best manner for any reform to proceed.

Certain observers agree that a national regulatory authority with a more focused brief is still possible under other heads of federal power, as is the option of instituting a cooperative framework with the provinces. There is debate as to the likelihood of the provinces' cooperation. In January 2012, Minister of Finance Jim Flaherty stated that work is still continuing with the provinces to create a national regulator that would function within the bounds that the Court declared was within federal jurisdiction.

There is also concern that, viewed on the general principles of the opinion with respect to the boundary between federal jurisdiction and the provincial property and civil rights power, the following recently enacted federal statutes may also be on constitutionally shaky ground:

 Personal Information Protection and Electronic Documents Act, and
 Fighting Internet and Wireless Spam Act, as well as
 amendments adopted in 2012 to insert digital rights management provisions into the Copyright Act

References

Canadian federalism case law
Supreme Court of Canada cases
2011 in Canadian case law
Supreme Court of Canada reference question cases